Putthipong Sriwat (more popularly known as Leo Putt (ลีโอ พุฒ), born April 1, 1976) is a Thai singer and actor. His films include Fake, Dynamite Warrior, and The Sperm.

He has Thai-dubbed for Tobey Maguire as Peter Parker/Spider-Man in Raimi's Spider-Man trilogy.

Filmography
 Goodbye Summer (1996) 
 Fake (2003)
 The Story of X-Circle (2004)
 Dynamite Warrior (2006)
 The Sperm (2007)
 Opapatika'' (2007)

External links

1976 births
Living people
Leo Putt
Leo Putt
Leo Putt
Leo Putt
Leo Putt
Leo Putt